Floris van de Werken (born 1 January 1995 in Warder) is a sailor from the Netherlands. He is a double World Championship gold medallist.

He is, with Bart Lambriex, the 2021 and 2022 49er World Champion

References

External links
 

Living people
1995 births
Dutch male sailors (sport)
49er class sailors
49er class world champions